Nuuk Pride is an LGBT festival which is held every June in Nuuk, Greenland. A colourful and festive occasion, it combines political issues with concerts, films and a parade and different arrangements. The focal point is Katuaq in the city centre. It usually opens on the day of the Pride arrangement, culminating with a parade. The first time the pride was held, some 1,000 gay, lesbian, transgender and bisexual people and supporters took part in the parade with floats and flags.

History
Nuuk Pride began in 2010. The city's pride festival has since been held every year.

See also

 Pride parade
 LGBT Qaamaneq
 LGBT rights in Greenland
 LGBT rights in Denmark

References

External links
Pride arrangement and book publishing 2014 on Katuaq (danish)

Festivals in Nuuk
Pride parades in Greenland
Recurring events established in 2010
LGBT in Greenland
Cultural festivals in Greenland
Arts festivals in Greenland
Music festivals in Greenland
Parades in Greenland